Columbine or Columbine Gold Camp is a former gold mining community in Routt County, Colorado, United States (near Clark, Colorado). Now it is an unincorporated community, historic district, and a rental cabin resort. It dates from around 1895.  It was listed as a historic district on the National Register of Historic Places in 2007.

It is located at  elevation.

Description
The historic register listing gave the community a bit of a boost.

Specific buildings include:
General Store / Columbine Mercantile Store (1898).  Built by James R. Caron, a store and post office from 1898 to 1967, a Conoco gas station from 1915 to 1967.  Now the registration office for cabin rentals.
Oil House (c.1915). Built by James R. Caron, it was used to store kerosene sold in the general store.
Skiers Cabin (c.1895), which served as "Hitter's Mercantile" before James Caron purchased the property and moved the store in 1898 to the Columbine Mercantile building.  One-story north-facing front-gabled log building with daubing, with notched corners at the north end and with metal roof installed in 1994 that extends out from the south end to two timber posts.  Although altered, has historic integrity.
Skiers Cabin Woodshed (1940s). One of two woodsheds built by Ross Crossley, a log building with notching and with a flat metal roof.

About 20 more buildings and structures exist.

It is a populated place; also 14 cabins are available for rent, billed as 1800s gold miner cabins.

See also

 National Register of Historic Places listings in Routt County, Colorado

References

External links

Unincorporated communities in Colorado
Populated places in Routt County, Colorado
Historic districts on the National Register of Historic Places in Colorado
Log buildings and structures in Colorado
National Register of Historic Places in Routt County, Colorado
Buildings and structures completed in 1895